Abdullah bin Ayub (3 January 1926 – 13 December 2018) was a Malaysian civil servant who served as the 6th Chief Secretary to the Government of Malaysia from 1 January 1979 to 30 November 1980.

Early life
Abdullah was born on 3 January 1926 in Pasir Panjang Laut, Sitiawan, Perak. He graduated with a B.A (hons) from University of Malaya, Singapore in 1953. In the same year, he was also awarded the "Queen's Scholarship" for his outstanding achievements.

Death
Abdullah died on 13 December 2018 at the National Heart Institute (IJN) in Kuala Lumpur. He was 92. He was laid to rest at the Bukit Kiara Muslim Cemetery, Kuala Lumpur.

Honours
  : 
 Officer of the Order of the Defender of the Realm (K.M.N.) (1964)
 Companion of the Order of the Defender of the Realm (J.M.N.) (1970)
 Commander of the Order of Loyalty to the Crown of Malaysia (P.S.M.) - Tan Sri (1976)
 Commander of the Order of the Defender of the Realm (P.M.N.) - Tan Sri (1979)
 Grand Commander of the Order of Loyalty to the Crown of Malaysia (S.S.M.) - Tun (2011)
  :
 Knight Grand Commander of Order of the Crown of Johor (S.P.M.J.) - Dato' (1980)
 
 Commander of the Order of Kinabalu (P.G.D.K) - Datuk
 
 Knight Commander of Order of the Crown of Terengganu (D.P.M.T) - Dato'
 
 Knight Commander of Order of the Loyalty to the Crown of Kelantan (D.P.S.K) - Dato'
 
 Knight of the Order of Cura Si Manja Kini (D.P.C.M.) - Dato’ (1973) 
 Grand Knight of the Order of Cura Si Manja Kini (S.P.C.M.) - Dato’ Seri (1979)

References

1926 births
2018 deaths
People from Perak
Malaysian people of Malay descent
Malaysian Muslims
Chief Secretaries to the Government of Malaysia
Members of the Dewan Negara
Grand Commanders of the Order of Loyalty to the Crown of Malaysia
Commanders of the Order of the Defender of the Realm
Commanders of the Order of Loyalty to the Crown of Malaysia
Knights Grand Commander of the Order of the Crown of Johor
Knights Commander of the Order of the Crown of Terengganu
Commanders of the Order of Kinabalu
Companions of the Order of the Defender of the Realm
Officers of the Order of the Defender of the Realm
Deaths from cerebrovascular disease